is a Japanese actress, voice actress, former singer and model. She is known for her roles in various tokusatsu series, film, and drama, such as "Nanami Nono / Hurricane Blue" in the series Super Sentai Ninpuu Sentai Hurricaneger.

Filmography 
  (film)
  - Nanami Nono/Hurricane Blue (Super Sentai, 2002)
 - Nanami Nono/Hurricane Blue (Super Sentai, 2002)
  - Nanami Nono/Hurricane Blue (Super Sentai, 2003)
  - Nanami Nono/Hurricane Blue (Super Sentai, 2004)
  - Natsumi (Ep.13-14) (Ultra Series, 2005–2006)
  - Nanami Nono/Hurricane Blue (Super Sentai, 2007)
  - Nikkei characters (fumetti)
 Girl's BOX the movie
  - Mayuko Hasekura (TV drama, 2008)
  - Daigo's mother (cameo) (Ultra Series, 2008)
  - Kirara Mamiya, 2009
 Hotel Chelsea - Emi Tanaka, 2009
 Daimajin Kanon - Ikechiyo, 2010
  - Lily Shirogane (Ep.27-28) (Kamen Rider Series, 2010)
  - Lily Shirogane (Cameo) (Kamen Rider Series, 2010)
  - Lily Shirogane (Kamen Rider Accel) (Kamen Rider Series, 2011)
  - Nanami Nono/Hurricane Blue (Ep. 25-26) (Super Sentai, 2011)
 A Day of One Hero - Herself (Direct-to-video special, 2011)
 Stand Up! Vanguard (STAND UP!! ヴァンガード) - Kumiko Miura (Hiroki's deceased mother), 2012
  - Utsugi Haruka (Ep.21-22, 48) (Kamen Rider Series, 2012)
  - Utsugi Haruka (Cameo) (Kamen Rider Series, 2012)
   - Utsugi Haruka (Kamen Rider Series, 2012)
 Great Teacher Onizuka - Katayama Saki (Great Teacher Onizuka, 2012)
  - Hadezukin  (Voice, Ep.20) (Super Sentai Series, 2013)
  - Nanami Nono/Hurricane Blue (Super Sentai, 2013)
 Travelers: Jigen Keisatsu - Ai, 2013
 009-1: The End of the Beginning - Miriam (2013)
  - Eagla (イーグラ Īgura) (Kamen Rider Series, 2016)
  - Maiko Asumi (Girls × Heroine Series, 2019)
 Utsusemi no Mori (2021)

Discography

Albums 
 2003 August 6: Trip Lip
 2006 March 29: BODIES
 2007 March 21: LOVE BODY -SEASON 1-
 2008 March 5: NAO BEST

Singles

References 
 Oricon Style (2005), Ranking - Oricon Style
 avex network inc. (2005), Nao Nagasawa official website

External links 
 Official avex trax artist site
 Official Starchild artist site
 Nagasawa Now! Official fan site
 3rd X'mas website
 Girl's BOX Official Web Site
 J!-ENT Girl's BOX Special Feature #1: Nagasawa Nao (2007)

Japanese voice actresses
Japanese television personalities
Japanese gravure idols
Japanese women pop singers
Avex Group artists
1984 births
Living people
Singers from Tokyo
21st-century Japanese singers
21st-century Japanese women singers